Alfred Zierler (born 1933 Himberg, Austria), is an Austrian medallist and engraver.

Biography 

Alfred Zierler was born in Himberg, near Vienna, on 28 May 1933. After Zierler had successfully completed an apprenticeship as an engraver, he found employment at the Vienna Mint where he remained until his retirement in 1993.  

Zierler was the engraver for the dies of the Austrian Mint, and served as the mint's chief engraver from 1984 to 1993. He also designed the post-WWII medals of the Republic of Austria.

In 1993, Zierler received the Goldenes Ehrenzeichen (Decoration of Honour in Gold) service medal from the Republic of Austria.

Work 

Zierler has designed a long list of Austrian coins, including:

 25 Schilling 1967 – 250th Anniversary of the birth of Maria Theresia. km 2901.
 100 Schilling 1977 – 500th Anniversary of the Hall Mint in Tyrol. km 3936
 50 Schilling 1978 – 150th Anniversary of the death of Franz Schubert. km 2937  
 100 Schilling 1978 – 1100th Anniversary of the city of Villach. km 2940
 100 Schilling 1979 – Vienna International Centre. km 2944
 500 Schilling 1981 – 100th Anniversary birth of Otto Bauer. km 2953
 500 Schilling 1982 – 80th Anniversary birth of Leopold Figl. km 2959
 500 Schilling 1984 – 175th Anniversary war of liberation in Tyrol. km 2966
 500 Schilling 1984 – 700th Anniversary of Stift Stams in Tyrol. km 2968
 500 Schilling 1985 – 40th Anniversary of the end of WW2. km 2972
 500 Schilling 1987 – 150 Years Austrian Railways. km 2981
 500 Schilling 1988 – 850th Anniversary of St. Georgenberg Abbey. km 2984
 500 Schilling 1989 – Gustav Klimt. km 2987
  20 Schilling 1991 – 200th Birthday of Franz Grillparzer. km 2995
 100 Schilling 1991 – 700th Anniversary of the death of Rudolf v. Habsburg. km 3001 
 1000 Schilling 1991 – 200th Anniversary of the death of Mozart. km 2999
 1000 Schilling 1994 – 800th Anniversary of the Vienna Mint. km 3018
 1000 Schilling 1995 – Olympics. km 3028

Notes

1933 births
Artists from Vienna
Currency designers
20th-century engravers
Austrian medallists
Austrian designers
Living people